
Bristol by-election may refer to:

Bristol 
 1878 Bristol by-election

Bristol East 
 1911 Bristol East by-election
 1931 Bristol East by-election

Bristol West 
 1928 Bristol West by-election
 1951 Bristol West by-election
 1957 Bristol West by-election

Bristol Central 
 1943 Bristol Central by-election

Bristol South East 
 1950 Bristol South East by-election
 1961 Bristol South East by-election
 1963 Bristol South East by-election